Ștefan Ionescu (17 February 1935 − 30 October 2022) was a Romanian ice hockey player. He competed in the men's tournaments at the 1964 Winter Olympics and the 1968 Winter Olympics.

References

External links

1935 births
2022 deaths
Olympic ice hockey players of Romania
Ice hockey players at the 1964 Winter Olympics
Ice hockey players at the 1968 Winter Olympics
Sportspeople from Bucharest
20th-century Romanian people